Pál Kadosa (6 September 1903, Léva, Austria-Hungary (now Levice, Slovakia) – 30 March 1983, Budapest) was a pianist and Hungarian composer of the post-Bartók generation.  His early style was influenced by Hungarian folklore while his later works were more toward Hindemith and expressively forceful idioms.  He was born in Levice. He studied at the national  Hungarian Royal Academy of Music under Zoltán Székely and Zoltán Kodály.  He was appointed to the faculty of the Fodor School in 1927 where he taught until 1943 when he was forced out due to wartime political issues.

In 1945 he joined the faculty of the Franz Liszt Academy where he taught, eventually becoming head of the piano department, until his death in 1983.  His students included such leading musicians as György Ligeti, György Kurtág, Iván Erőd, Ferenc Rados, Arpad Joó, András Schiff, Zoltán Kocsis, Dezső Ránki, Valéria Szervánszky, Ronald Cavaye, Jenő Jandó, Kenji Watanabe, István Kassai, and Balázs Szokolay, among others..

Kadosa served on the Hungarian Arts Council and become an honorary member of the Royal Academy of Music. Kadosa's work included two operas, eight symphonies, four sonatas, and six concertos.

References

External links
 
 

1903 births
1983 deaths
People from Levice
Hungarian Jews
Hungarian classical composers
20th-century classical composers
Academic staff of the Franz Liszt Academy of Music
Hungarian male classical composers
Artists of Merit of the Hungarian People's Republic
Pupils of Zoltán Kodály
Burials at Kerepesi Cemetery
20th-century Hungarian male musicians
Jewish classical composers